67th Regiment or 67th Infantry Regiment may refer to:

67th (South Hampshire) Regiment of Foot, an infantry unit of the British Army 
67th Infantry Regiment, a unit of the Ottoman Empire during World War I which fought at the Battle of Beersheba (1917)
67th Infantry Regiment (United States), a unit of the US Army during World War I
67th Armored Regiment, a armoured unit of the US Army, the former 67th Infantry Regiment (Medium Tanks)

American Civil War
67th Illinois Volunteer Infantry Regiment, a unit of the Union (Northern) Army
67th Indiana Infantry Regiment, a unit of the Union (Northern) Army
67th New York Infantry, a unit of the Union (Northern) Army
67th Ohio Infantry, a unit of the Union (Northern) Army
67th United States Colored Infantry Regiment, a unit of the Union (Northern) Army

See also
 67th Division (disambiguation)
 67 Squadron (disambiguation)